Clifton Eric Tucker (21 March 1888 – 3 September 1973) was an Australian rules footballer who played with University in the Victorian Football League (VFL).

Sources

1888 births
1973 deaths
Australian rules footballers from Victoria (Australia)
University Football Club players